The year 2017 is the 5th year in the history of the Absolute Championship Berkut, a mixed martial arts and kickboxing promotion based in Russia.

List of events

ACB 51: Silva vs. Torgeson

Absolute Championship Berkut 51: Silva vs. Torgeson was a mixed martial arts event held by Absolute Championship Berkut on January 13, 2017 at the Bren Events Center in Irvine, California United States.

Background
This event featured a world title fight for the vacant ACB Light Heavyweight Championship between Thiago Silva and Jared Ferguson as headliner.

A Heavyweight bout between Michal Andryszak and Mike Kyle was scheduled for this card. However, the fight was cancelled due to visa problem sustained by Andryszak.

Bonus awards:
 
The following fighters were awarded $10,000 bonuses:
Fight of the Night: Kyle Reyes  vs. Mario Israel
Knockout of the Night: Arthur Estrázulas

Result

ACB 52: Another Level of MMA Fighting

Absolute Championship Berkut 52: Another Level of MMA Fighting was a mixed martial arts event held by Absolute Championship Berkut on January 21, 2017 at the Hallmann dome in Vienna, Austria.

Background
6 fighters from Russia, who were to perform at the ACB 52 tournament in Vienna, have not been able to participate due to visa problems.

The fight between Patrik Kincl and Arbi Agujev was originally a 2nd-round TKO win by Kincl. The fight was overturned in a No Contest by the ACB official, because the referee stopped the fight too soon.

The fight between João Luis Nogueira and Shamil Nikaev was originally a unanimous decision win by Nogueira. The judges decision was Overturned in a No Contest by the ACB official.

Bonus awards:
 
The following fighters were awarded $10,000 bonuses:

Knockout of the Night: Ismail Naurdiev
Submission of the Night: Matjaz Vicar

Result

ACB 53: Young Eagles 15

Absolute Championship Berkut 53: Young Eagles 15 was a mixed martial arts event held by Absolute Championship Berkut on February 18, 2017 at the Hala Urania in Olsztyn, Poland.

Background
Bonus awards:
 
The following fighters were awarded $5,000 bonuses:

Fight of the Night: Pawel Kielek vs Bai-Ali Shaipov
Knockout of the Night: Dmitriy Shestakov
Submission of the Night: Mehdi Baydulaev

Result

ACB 54: Supersonic

Absolute Championship Berkut 54: Supersonic was a mixed martial arts event held by Absolute Championship Berkut on March 11, 2017 at the Manchester Arena in Manchester, England.

Background
This event featured a Champion vs. Champion fight between The KSW Middleweight Champion Mamed Khalidov and the Venator FC Middleweight Champion Luke Barnatt as headliner, Also the event was originally scheduled to be co-headlined by a welterweight title fight between Brett Cooper and Aslambek Saidov. However, on February 14, it was announced that Cooper had to withdraw from his first title defense due to serious health issues. Saidov  has faced ACB newcomer Ion Pascu. Lightweight Pat Healy and light heavyweight Vinny Magalhaes both suffered injuries in the lead up to the event, and they will no longer participate in the event.

Bonus awards:

The following fighters were awarded $10,000 bonuses:

Fight of the Night: Joshua Aveles vs. Amirkhan Adaev
Knockout of the Night: Brendan Loughnane
Submission of the Night: Ali Bagov

Result

ACB 55: Dushanbe

Absolute Championship Berkut 55: Dushanbe was a mixed martial arts event held by Absolute Championship Berkut on March 24, 2017 at the Tax Committee Sports Center in Dushanbe, Tajikistan.

Background
Gamzat Khiramagomedov was injured during the preparation for his fight and was forced to withdraw from his match against Will Noland.

Evgeniy Lazukov was injured and couldn't participate in his Fight against Muin Gafurov, and was subsequently replaced by Georgian fighter Beno Adamia.

Donald Sanchez and Abdul-Rahman Temirov has to withdraw due to injury, Yusuf Raisov and valdines Silva will now face each other in the co-main event of the evening.

Bonus awards:
 
The following fighters were awarded $10,000 bonuses:
Fight of the Night: Shakhbulatov vs. Macek
Submission of the Night: Igor Fernandes
ACB League Founder Bonus : Mukhamed Berkhamov

Result

ACB KB 9: Showdown in Paris

 Absolute Championship Berkut Kickboxing 9: Showdown in Paris was a kickboxing event held by Absolute Championship Berkut on March 25, 2017  at the Palais des Sports Marcel-Cerdan in Paris, France.

Result

ACB 56: Young Eagles 16

Absolute Championship Berkut 56: Young Eagles 16 was a mixed martial arts event held by Absolute Championship Berkut on April 1, 2017  in Minsk, Belarus.

Bonus awards:
 
The following fighters were awarded $5,000 bonuses:
Fight of the Night: Odintsov vs. Elzhurkaev
Submission of the Night: Andrey Krasnikov
Knockout of the Nights: Nashkho Galaev

Result

ACB 57: Payback

Absolute Championship Berkut 57: Payback was a mixed martial arts event held by Absolute Championship Berkut on April 15, 2017 at the Luzhniki Palace of Sports in Moscow, Russia.

Background
This event featured the highly anticipated rematch for the ACB Bantamweight Championship between Magomed Magomedov and Petr Yan as headliner.
 
The title fight between Abdul-Aziz Abdulvakhabov and. Andrey Koshkin is off. The Bout will be Rescheduled to ACB 61 due to Abdulvakhabov knee injury.

Matheus Mattos will replace Tural Ragimov in fight against Magomed Ginazov.

Albert Duraev is out due to Illness, Ibragim Chuzhigaev will step in as a short notice replacement against Vyacheslav Vasilevsky.

Konstantin Erokhin is out due to injury, Georgy Sakaev will step in as a short notice replacement against Azamat Murzakanov.

Bonus awards:
 
The following fighters were awarded $10,000 bonuses:
Fight of the Night: Ginazov vs. Mattos
Submission of the Night: Mukhamed Kokov

Result

ACB 58: Young Eagles 17

Absolute Championship Berkut 58: Young Eagles 17 was a mixed martial arts event held by Absolute Championship Berkut on April 22, 2017 at the Gamid Gamidov Palace of Sports in Khasavyurt, Russia.

Background
Bonus awards:
 
The following fighters were awarded $5,000 bonuses:
Fight of the Night: Magomadov vs Grozin
Submission of the Night: Askar Askarov

Result

ACB 59: Young Eagles 18

Absolute Championship Berkut 59: Young Eagles 18 was a mixed martial arts event held by Absolute Championship Berkut on April 29, 2017 at the Palace of sports "Manege" in Vladikavkaz, Russia.

Mairbek Khasiev canceled this event. The reason was racist problems between Chechens and Ossetians. Greater likelihood of conflict.

Background

Result

ACB 60: Aguev vs. Devent

Absolute Championship Berkut 60: Aguev vs. Devent was a mixed martial arts event held by Absolute Championship Berkut on May 13, 2017 in Vienna, Austria.

Background
Bonus awards:
 
The following fighters will be awarded $10,000 bonuses:
Fight of the Night: Herdeson Batista vs Rasul Yakhyaev 
Knockout of the Night: Arbi Agujev
Submission of the Night: Marko Burušić

Result

ACB 61: Balaev vs. Bataev

Absolute Championship Berkut 61: Balaev vs. Bataev was a mixed martial arts event held by Absolute Championship Berkut on May 20, 2017  in Saint Petersburg, Russia.

Background
The bout between Ilya Shcheglov (5-1) and Wallyson Carvalho (8-2) is canceled due to Shcheglov's injury.

The fight between Andrei Koshkin and Eduard Vartanyan was canceled due to Vartanyan's injury.

Bonus awards:

The following fighters were awarded $10,000 bonuses:
Fight of the Night: Balaev vs Bataev
Submission of the Night: Arman Ospanov

Result

ACB 59: Young Eagles 18

Absolute Championship Berkut 59:  Young Eagles 18 was a mixed martial arts event held by Absolute Championship Berkut on May 25, 2017  in Grozny, Russia.

Background
This event was moved from Vladikavkaz to Grozny.

Bonus awards:
 
The following fighters were awarded $5,000 bonuses:
Fight of the Night:  Keldibekov vs. Dzhabrailov
Knockout of the Night: Yusup Umarov
Submission of the Night: Daud Shaikhaev
Special bonus from Mairbek Khasiev: Baysangur Vakhitov
$3000 Stoppage Victory Bonuses: Gadjimurad Olohanov, Aslan Shogov, Ilyas Yakubov, Rustam Gadzhiev, Abdisalam Kubanych, Shamil Akhmaev, Sukhrob Davlatov

Result

ACB 62: Stepanyan vs. Cruz

Absolute Championship Berkut 62: Stepanyan vs. Cruz was a mixed martial arts event held by Absolute Championship Berkut on June 17, 2017  in Rostov-on-Don, Russia.

Background
The fight between Igor Fernandes and Michail Tsarev was canceled due to Tsarev's injury.

Adam Townsend was slated to make his ACB debut in this event against Alexandr Shabily. Unfortunately, Townsend came in on the scales at 162 lbs. The bout against Shabily was canceled.

Bonus awards:
 
The following fighters will be awarded $10,000 bonuses:
Fight of the Night: Valeriy Khazhirokov vs Isaac Pimentel
Knockout of the Night: Akop Stepanyan
Submission of the Night: Jonas Billstein
$5000 Stoppage Victory Bonuses: Alexander Peduson, Dovletdzhan Yagshimuradov, Sergei Bilostenniy, Sergey Martynov, Narek Avagyan, Evgeny Belyaev

Result

ACB 63: Celiński vs. Magalhaes

Absolute Championship Berkut 63: Celiński vs. Magalhaes was a mixed martial arts event held by Absolute Championship Berkut on July 1, 2017  in Gdańsk, Poland.

Background
Bonus awards:
 
The following fighters will be awarded $10,000 bonuses:
Fight of the Night: Adrian Zieliński vs Piotr Hallmann
Submission of the Night: Mindaugas Verzbickas
$5000 Stoppage Victory Bonuses: Piotr Strus, Przemyslaw Mysiala, Patrik Kincl, Paweł Kiełek, Luke Barnatt

Result

ACB KB 10: Russia vs. China

 Absolute Championship Berkut Kickboxing 10: Russia vs. China was a kickboxing event held by Absolute Championship Berkut on July 15, 2017  at Izmailovo Sports Palace in Moscow, Russia.

Result

ACB 64: Young Eagles 19

Absolute Championship Berkut 64: Young Eagles 19 was a mixed martial arts event held by Absolute Championship Berkut on July 19, 2017  at the Antalya Arena Spor Salonu in Antalya, Turkey.

Background
Bonus awards:
 
The following fighters will be awarded $5,000 bonuses:
Fight of the Night: Magomed Khamzaev vs Maksim Maryanchuk
Knockout of the Night: Nashkho Galaev
Submission of the Night: Anzor Shakhmurzaev
$3000 Stoppage Victory Bonuses: Vazha Tsiptauri, Khusein Maltsagov, Furkan Ari, Khusein Sheikhaev, Kadir Dalkiran

Result

ACB 65: Silva vs. Agnaev

Absolute Championship Berkut 65: Silva vs. Agnaev was a mixed martial arts event held by Absolute Championship Berkut on July 22, 2017  at the Sheffield Arena in Sheffield, England.

Background
The event will be the second that the promotion have host in California, U.S. and first since ACB 51: Silva vs. Torgeson in January 2017.

Bonus awards:
 
The following fighters will be awarded $10,000 bonuses:
Fight of the Night: Joshua Aveles vs Leandro Sillva
Knockout of the Night: Alexey Polpudnikov
Submission of the Night: Aaron Robinson
$5000 Stoppage Victory Bonuses: Simon Stadnicki, Likasz Pilch, Antonio Sheldon, Aaron Aby, Mike Grundy, Sam Boult, Vyacheslav Vasilevskiy, Batraz Agnaev

Result

ACB 66: Young Eagles 20

Absolute Championship Berkut 66: Young Eagles 20 was a mixed martial arts event held by Absolute Championship Berkut on August 5, 2017 at the Sports Hall Coliseum in Grozny, Russia.

Background
Bonus awards:
 
The following fighters will be awarded $5,000 bonuses:
Fight of the Night: Walter Pereira jr. vs Islam Yunusov
Knockout of the Night: Herdeson Batista
Submission of the Night: Akhmed Kukaev
$3000 Stoppage Victory Bonuses: Abdulla Almurzaev, Aleksandr Antonenko, Inal Kerimov, Aslan Izmailov, Stanislav Zinchenko, Movsar Bokov, Mehdi Baidulaev, Vaha Shanhoev, Vadim Panevin, Rustam Taldiev, Amirkhan Guliev, Viskhan Magomadov, Baisangur Vakhitov

Fight card

ACB 67: Cooper vs. Berkhamov

Absolute Championship Berkut 67: Cooper vs. Berkhamov will be a mixed martial arts event held by Absolute Championship Berkut on August 19, 2017  in Grozny, Russia.

Background

Bonus awards:
 
The following fighters will be awarded $10,000 bonuses:
Fight of the Night: Yusuf Raisov vs. Luis Palomino
Knockout of the Night: Alexandr Shabliy
Submission of the Night: Rasul Albaskhanov
$5000 Stoppage Victory Bonuses: Rasul Shovhalov, Amirkhan Adaev, Jose Daniel Toledo, Magomed Magomedov, Albert Duraev, Mukhomad Vakhaev, Mukhamed Berkhamov

Fight card

ACB 68: Young Eagles 21

Absolute Championship Berkut 68: Young Eagles 21 will be a mixed martial arts event held by Absolute Championship Berkut on August 26, 2017 at the Tax Committee Sports Center in Dushanbe, Tajikistan.

Background
Bonus awards:
 
The following fighters will be awarded $5,000 bonuses:
Knockout of the Night: Magomed Raisov
Submission of the Night: Firdavs Nazarov
$3000 Stoppage Victory Bonuses: Radzhabali Fayzidini, Mubaraksho Mubarakshoev, Denis Kanakov, Lambert Akhiadov, Kiamrian Abbasov, Fatkhidin Sobirov, Stanislav Vlasenko, Sharaf Davlatmurodov

Fight card

ACB 69: Young Eagles 22

Absolute Championship Berkut 69: Young Eagles 22 will be a mixed martial arts event held by Absolute Championship Berkut on September 9, 2017 at the Almaty Arena in Almaty, Kazakhstan.

Background

Bonus awards:
 
The following fighters will be awarded $5,000 bonuses:
Fight of the Night: Khamzat Aushev vs Mauricio Reis
Knockout of the Night: Islam Isaev
Submission of the Night: Rakhman Makhadzhiev
$3000 Stoppage Victory Bonuses: Bakhtiyar Nesipbek, Karshyga Dautbek, Almanbet Zhanybekov, Asu Almabaev, Asylzhan Bakhytzhanuly, Saifulla Dzhabrailov, Alikhan Suleimanov, Cory Hendricks, Aurel Pirtea, Sergej Grecicho, Igor Svirid, Thiago Silva

Fight card

ACB 70: The Battle of Britain

Absolute Championship Berkut 70: The Battle of Britain was a mixed martial arts event held by Absolute Championship Berkut on September 23, 2017vat the Sheffield Arena in Sheffield, England.

Background
Regis Sugden is forced out through injury, Richard Herbert steps in to face Jordan Barton.

Bonus awards:
 
The following fighters will be awarded $10,000 bonuses:
Fight of the Night: Askham vs. Barnatt
Knockout of the Night: Ibragim Chuzhigaev 
Submission of the Night: Cheya Saleem
$5000 Stoppage Victory Bonuses: Adam Townsend, Bubba Jenkins, Magomed Ginazov

Fight card

ACB 71: Yan vs. Mattos

Absolute Championship Berkut 71: Yan vs. Mattos will be a mixed martial arts event held by Absolute Championship Berkut on September 30, 2017 at the Dynamo Sports Palace in Moscow, Russia.

Background
Mukhamed Kokov and Said-Khamzat Avkhadov didn't make weight. Alexnder Peduson and Akop Stepanyan refused to accept bouts, both fight were canceled.

Bonus awards:
 
The following fighters will be awarded $10,000 bonuses:
Fight of the Night: Eduard Vartanyan vs. Andrey Koshkin
Knockout of the Night: Aslambek Saidov
Submission of the Night: Ruslan Abiltarov
$5000 Stoppage Victory Bonuses: Amirkhan Isagadjiev, Rustam Kerimov, Oleg Borisov, Jonas Billstein, Petr Yan

Result

ACB KB 11 / Wu Lin Feng

Absolute Championship Berkut KB 11 / Wu Lin Feng was a kickboxing event held by Absolute Championship Berkut on October 7, 2017 at the Henan TV Studio 8 in Zhengzhou, China.

Background

Bonus awards:
 
The following fighters will be awarded $10,000 bonuses:
Fight of the Night:
Knockout of the Night:
Submission of the Night:

Results

ACB 72: Makovsky vs. Sherbatov

Absolute Championship Berkut 72: Makovsky vs. Sherbatov will be a mixed martial arts event held by Absolute Championship Berkut on October 14, 2017 at the Tohu in Montreal, Quebec, Canada.

Background

Bonus awards:
 
The following fighters will be awarded $10,000 bonuses:
Fight of the Night:
Knockout of the Night:
Submission of the Night:

Results

ACB 73: Silva vs. Makoev

Absolute Championship Berkut 73: Silva vs. Makoev will be a mixed martial arts event held by Absolute Championship Berkut on October 21, 2017 at the Miécimo da Silva Sports Complex in Rio de Janeiro, Brazil.

Background

Bonus awards:
 
The following fighters will be awarded $10,000 bonuses:
Knockout of the Night: Adlan Bataev
Submission of the Night: Ary Farias
$5000 Stoppage Victory Bonuses: Jose Maria Tome

Results

ACB KB 12: Warriors Of Light

Absolute Championship Berkut KB 12: Warriors Of Light will be a kickboxing event held by Absolute Championship Berkut on November 10, 2017 at the Marriott Congress Center in Los Angeles, California, United States.

Background

Bonus awards:
 
The following fighters will be awarded $10,000 bonuses:
Fight of the Night:
Knockout of the Night:
Submission of the Night:

Results

ACB 74: Aguev vs. Townsend

 Absolute Championship Berkut 74: Aguev vs. Townsend will be a mixed martial arts event held by Absolute Championship Berkut at the Wiener Stadthalle on November 18, 2017 in Vienna, Austria.

Background
ACB 74 was supposed to hold event in Dubau, United Arab Emirates but for unknown reasons was moved to Vienna, Austria.

Bonus awards:
 
The following fighters will be awarded $10,000 bonuses:
Fight of the Night: Piotr Strus vs. Nikola Dipchikov
Knockout of the Night: Ismail Naurdiev
Submission of the Night: Darren Mima
$5000 Stoppage Victory Bonuses: Stanislav Vlasenko, Lom-Ali Eskijew, Andrew Fisher, Thiago Silva, Mukhamed Aushev

Results

ACB 75: Gadzhidaudov vs. Zieliński

Absolute Championship Berkut 75: Gadzhidaudov vs. Zieliński was a mixed martial arts event held by Absolute Championship Berkut on November 25, 2017 at the Carl Benz Arena in Stuttgart, Germany.

Background
Dennis Siver was set to make his ACB debut, but withdrew due to a shoulder injury.
Beslan Isaev, Rasul Shovkhalov, and Shamil Shakbulatov were denied entry to Germany. So they were also removed from the card.

Bonus awards:
 
The following fighters were awarded $10,000 bonuses:
Knockout of the Night: Dovletdzhan Yagshimuradov
Submission of the Night: Aurel Pirtea
$5000 Stoppage Victory Bonuses: Ustarmagomed Gadjidaudov, Brendan Loughnane

Results

ACB 76: Young Eagles 23

Absolute Championship Berkut 76: Young Eagles 23 will be a mixed martial arts event held by Absolute Championship Berkut on December 9, 2017 at the Gold Coast Convention and Exhibition Centre in Gold Coast, Australia.

Background

Bonus awards:
 
The following fighters will be awarded $5,000 bonuses:
Fight of the Night: Anthony Leone vs. Dean Garnett
Knockout of the Night: Mohammed Alavi
Submission of the Night: Trent Girdham
$3000 Stoppage Victory Bonuses: Brett Cooper, Azamat Amagov, Michael Tobin, Shannon McClellan, Saeed Fatahfir, Johnny Walker

Results

ACB 77: Abdulvakhabov vs. Vartanyan 2

Absolute Championship Berkut 77: Abdulvakhabov vs. Vartanyan 2 will be a mixed martial arts event held by Absolute Championship Berkut on December 23, 2017 at the Luzhniki Palace of Sports in Moscow, Russia.

Background

Bonus awards:
 
The following fighters were awarded $10,000 bonuses:
Fight of the Night: Alexey Polpudnikov vs. Arman Ospanov
Knockout of the Night: Cory Hendricks
Submission of the Night: Ali Eskiev
$5000 Stoppage Victory Bonuses: Sergei Bilostenniy, Gamzat Khiramagomedov, Asylzhan Bakhytzhanuly, Denis Goltsov, Yusuf Raisov and Albert Duraev

Results

References

Absolute Championship Akhmat
Absolute Championship Berkut events
2017 in mixed martial arts